This list of military aircraft of Japan includes project, prototype, pre-production and operational types regardless of era. This includes both domestically developed Japanese designs, licensed variants of foreign designs, and foreign-produced aircraft that served in the military of Japan.

Japanese names are used here, not World War II Allied codenames. 
The prefix "Ki" in this list is an abbreviation of "Kitai", meaning "airframe", and was used only by the Imperial Japanese Army Air Force. "Ki" should be read as one word. For clarification on other designations, particularly those used by the Navy, see Japanese military aircraft designation systems. (Note: " - " indicates information is unknown or not applicable.)

Post-1945

Pre-1945

See also
List of aircraft of Japan, World War II

References

Citations

Bibliography

Japanese military-related lists
Japan Military Aircraft